Josh Guzdek (born 23 April 1995) is a professional rugby league footballer who plays as a  for the Sheffield Eagles in the Betfred Championship.

He previously played for Hull Kingston Rovers and the Dewsbury Rams.

A former Skirlaugh Bulls player, he has been with Hull KR since the age of 13 and progressed through the academy system. In 2013, he made 1 appearance for Hull KR against London Broncos, and scored just 30 seconds into the game with his first touch of the ball. He was a member of Hull KR first team.

In October 2015 he joined the Dewbury Rams.

Guzdek joined the Sheffield Eagles on a two-year deal in October 2018. He helped the Eagles to win the inaugural 1895 Cup as they defeated Widnes Vikings 36–18 in the final.

References

1995 births
Living people
Dewsbury Rams players
English rugby league players
Hull Kingston Rovers players
Keighley Cougars players
Rugby league fullbacks
Rugby league players from Yorkshire
Sheffield Eagles players